Frank Domínguez (born Francisco Manuel Ramón Dionisio Domínguez y Radeón on 9 October 1927 in Matanzas, Cuba – died 29 October 2014 in Mexico) was a Cuban composer and pianist of the filin movement. Born in Matanzas, he began to play piano at 8.

His most famous song, "Tú me acostumbraste", was written in 1955 and has been recorded by many singers among them, Olga Guillot, Lupita D’Alessio, Luis Miguel, Chavela Vargas, Pedro Vargas, Caetano Veloso, Luciano Tajoli, Domenico Modugno, Tom Jones, Lola Flores, Sara Montiel, Andrea Bocelli and the Gipsy Kings

References

Cuban composers
Male composers
Cuban pianists
1927 births
2014 deaths
Bolero singers
20th-century composers
21st-century composers
20th-century pianists
21st-century pianists
20th-century Cuban writers
21st-century Cuban writers
Cuban male musicians